Stegall may refer to:

People 
 William Stegall III, Investor (Route One Investment Company, based in San Francisco) 
Caleb Stegall, American attorney and writer
Casey Stegall (born 1979), network correspondent for Fox News Channel, based in Los Angeles
Keith Stegall (born 1955), American country music recording artist and record producer
Milt Stegall (born 1970), retired professional gridiron football player
Red Steagall or Red Stegall (born 1938), American actor, musician, poet, and stage performer
Sarah Stegall, contributor to SFScope, an online trade journal devoted to entertainment news

Places 

 Stegall, Arkansas, unincorporated community in Jackson County, Arkansas, United States

See also
Glass–Steagall Legislation
STEGAL
Stagg Hall
Steggall
Steagall